The 1980 season was the Hawthorn Football Club's 56th season in the Victorian Football League and 79th overall.

Fixture

Premiership season

Ladder

References

Hawthorn Football Club seasons